John Holdsworth (17 June 1947 – 17 February 2023) was a rugby league referee from Kippax, West Riding of Yorkshire, England.

Career
Holdsworth took charge of matches during the 1980s and 1990s, and was the referee for Wigan's 36–14 victory over Warrington in the 1990 Challenge Cup Final during the 1989–90 season at Wembley Stadium, London on Saturday 28 April 1990.

International referee
Holdsworth refereed a number of international Test matches during his career. His first international came on 20 March 1980 when England defeated Wales 17–4 at Boothferry Park in Hull. His last test as a referee was at the Stade d'Albert Domec in Carcassonne, France on 21 November 1993 in a game which saw New Zealand defeat hosts France 36–11 as part of the Kiwis 1993 tour of Great Britain and France.

Death
Holdsworth died on 17 February 2023, at the age of 75.

References

1947 births
2023 deaths
English rugby league referees
People from Kippax, West Yorkshire
Sportspeople from Yorkshire